Swallowed in Black is the second full-length album by Sadus released in 1990. Reissued by Displeased Records in 2007 with 3 bonus tracks and a videoclip.

Track listing

2007 Reissue bonus tracks
 "The wake (demo)"
"Powers of Hate (demo)"
"Good Rid'nz (demo)"
"Good Rid'nz (video clip)"

Credits
Darren Travis – guitar, vocals
Rob Moore – guitar
Steve Di Giorgio – bass
Jon Allen – drums

Charts

Monthly

References

1990 albums
Sadus albums
Roadrunner Records albums